Munnerlyn is a surname. Notable people with the surname include:

Captain Munnerlyn (born 1988), American football player
Charles Munnerlyn (born 1940), American optical engineer
Munnerlyn Formula
Charles James Munnerlyn (1822–1898), American politician and Confederate Army soldier

See also
Munnerlyn, Georgia